Mammendorf station is a railway station in the municipality of Mammendorf, located in the district of Fürstenfeldbruck in Upper Bavaria, Germany.

References

External links

Munich S-Bahn stations
Railway stations in Bavaria
Railway stations in Germany opened in 1840
1840 establishments in Bavaria
Buildings and structures in Fürstenfeldbruck (district)